The papacy of Pius XII (Eugenio Pacelli) began on 2 March 1939 and continued to 9 October 1958, covering the period of the Second World War and the Holocaust, during which millions of Jews and others were murdered by Adolf Hitler's Germany. Before becoming pope, Cardinal Pacelli served as a Vatican diplomat in Germany and as Vatican Secretary of State under Pius XI. His role during the Nazi period has been closely scrutinised and criticised. His supporters argue that Pius employed diplomacy to aid the victims of the Nazis during the war and, through directing his Church to provide discreet aid to Jews and others, saved hundreds of thousands of lives. Pius maintained links to the German Resistance, and shared intelligence with the Allies. His strongest public condemnation of genocide was, however, considered inadequate by the Allied Powers, while the Nazis viewed him as an Allied sympathizer who had dishonoured his policy of Vatican neutrality.

Some post-war critics have accused Pius of either being overly cautious, or of "not doing enough", or even of "silence" in the face of the Holocaust.  Supporters have held that he saved thousands, if not tens or hundreds of thousands of Jews by ordering his Church to provide them with sanctuary and aid, and that he provided moral and intellectual leadership in opposition to the violent racism of Nazi ideology.

As Secretary of State, he had been a critic of Nazism and helped draft the 1937 Mit brennender Sorge anti-Nazi encyclical. In his 1939 Summi Pontificatus first papal encyclical, Pius XII expressed dismay at the 1939 Invasion of Poland (without ascribing blame); reiterated Catholic teaching in support of universal brotherhood; and endorsed resistance against those opposed to the ethical principles of the "Revelation on Sinai" and the Sermon on the Mount. At Christmas 1942, once evidence of the industrial slaughter of the Jews had emerged, he voiced concern at the murder of "hundreds of thousands" of "faultless" people because of their "nationality or race". The degree of Pius's efforts to block Nazi deportations of Jews remains a matter of scholarly debate. Upon his death in 1958, Pius was praised emphatically by the Israeli Foreign Minister, and other world leaders. President Dwight D. Eisenhower called him a "foe of tyranny" and a "friend and benefactor to those who were oppressed". His insistence on Vatican neutrality and avoidance of directly naming the Nazis as the evildoers of World War II became the foundation for contemporary and later criticisms from some quarters. Studies of the Vatican archives and international diplomatic correspondence continue.

Background
Two Popes served through the Nazi period: Pope Pius XI (1922–1939) and Pope Pius XII (1939–1958). The Holy See strongly criticized Nazism through the late 1920s and throughout the 1930s, with Cardinal Pacelli (later Pope Pius XII) being a particularly outspoken critic. In 1933, the Vatican signed a Concordat (Reichskonkordat) with Germany, hoping to protect the rights of Catholics under the Nazi government. The terms of the Treaty were not kept by Hitler. According to the Encyclopedia Britannica: "From 1933 to 1936 [Pius XI] wrote several protests against the Third Reich, and his attitude toward fascist Italy changed dramatically after Nazi racial policies were introduced into Italy in 1938."

Pius XI offered three encyclicals against the rising tide of European totalitarianism: Non abbiamo bisogno (1931; "We Do Not Need to Acquaint You" – against Italian Fascism); Mit brennender Sorge (1937; "With Deep Anxiety" – against Nazism) and Divini redemptoris (1937; "Divine Redeemer" – against atheist Communism). "Non abbiamo bisogno" directly challenged Italian fascism as a "pagan" movement which "snatches the young from the Church and from Jesus Christ, and which inculcates in its own young people hatred, violence and irreverence". Pius XI also challenged the extremist nationalism of the Action Française movement and antisemitism in the United States.

With Europe on the brink of war, Pius XI died on 10 February 1939 and Pacelli was elected to succeed him as Pope Pius XII. The Nazi Government was the only government not to send a representative to his coronation. Pius lobbied world leaders hard to avoid war and then pursued a policy of cautious diplomacy following the outbreak of the war.

From around 1942, the Nazis had begun to implement their final solution – the industrial extermination of Europe's Jews.

Protests to Nazi Germany prior to pontificate
As Vatican Secretary of State, Cardinal Pacelli made some 55 protests against Nazi policies, including its "ideology of race". Pacelli also helped Pius XI draft the 1937 Mit brennender Sorge critique of Nazi ideology. Written partly in response to the Nuremberg Laws, the document did not refer to Hitler or the Nazis by name, but condemned racial theories and the mistreatment of people based on race. In 1938, Pacelli publicly restated the words of Pius XI on the incompatibility of Christianity and antisemitism: "It is impossible for a Christian to take part in anti-Semitism. Anti-Semitism is inadmissible; spiritually we are all Semites."

1938

Hungarian Eucharistic Congress 
Cardinal Pacelli (the later Pope Pius XII) addressed the International Eucharistic Conference that took place in Budapest, Hungary, between 25 and 29 May 1938, and, according to Holocaust scholar and historian Michael Phayer, described the Jews as people "whose lips curse [Christ] and whose hearts reject him even today". Phayer asserts that the timing of the statement, during a period when Hungary was in the process of formulating new antisemitic laws, ran counter to a statement of Pope Pius XI of September 1937 urging Catholics to honour their spiritual father Abraham. 

Historians Ronald Rychlak and William Doino Jr. have argued that Pacelli was not referring to Jews because Time Magazine did not mention this in its report of the conference. According to Rychlak and Doino, Pacelli, early in his talk, spoke about biblical history, recalled the Passion of Christ and referred to the masses that called for the Crucifixion who had been "deceived and excited by propaganda, lies, insults and imprecations at the foot of the Cross", but with no reference to Jews. Later in the speech, Pacelli referred to those who were persecuting the Church at that time by doing things like expelling religion and perverting Christianity, and since Jews were not doing this, but Nazi Germany was, the Pope "was clearly equating the Nazis, not Jews, to those who persecuted the Church at earlier times". They report that Pacelli then returned to the theme of Christ's sufferings that was being repeated in his day through, in their opinion, totalitarian regimes (not Jews) and exhorted his listeners, "Let us replace the cry of 'Crucify' made by Christ's enemies, with the 'Hosanna' of our fidelity and our love."

Gabriel Wilensky, while accepting that Pacelli may indeed allude to communists and Nazis earlier in the speech, rejects Rychlak and Doino's interpretation that excludes Jews.  Wilensky notes that when Pacelli speaks in a later passage of the call "Crucify him!" Pacelli is referring to the New Testament in which it is Jews who are described as calling out "Crucify him!" Wilensky further notes that Pacelli's comments were stereotypical of the way Jews were once portrayed by the Church as Christ-killers and deicides. (See also La Civiltà Cattolica and Nostra aetate.)

The influential Vatican journal La Civiltà Cattolica continued to print attacks against Hungarian Jews during this period, asserting that Hungary could be saved from Jewish influence which was "disastrous for the religious, moral, and social life of the Hungarian people" only if the government forbids them entry to the country. Holocaust historian Paul O'Shea notes, "There is no evidence that he [Pacelli] objected to the anti-Jewish rants of Civiltà Cattolica, which, as Secretary of State to Pius XI, he at least tacitly approved. The Pope or his Secretary of State gave the final fiat for the editorial content of the journal. There is no way that Cardinal Pacelli could not have known of the Judeophobia written in Civiltà."

1939

Nazis oppose election of Pacelli as Pope

The Nazi regime disapproved of Pacelli's election as Pope. Historian of the Holocaust Martin Gilbert wrote: "So outspoken were Pacelli’s criticisms that Hitler’s regime lobbied against him, trying to prevent his becoming the successor to Pius XI. When he did become Pope, as Pius XII, in March 1939, Nazi Germany was the only government not to send a representative to his coronation." Joseph Goebbels noted in his diary on 4 March 1939 that Hitler was considering whether to abrogate the Concordat with Rome in light of Pacelli's election as Pope, adding, "This will surely happen when Pacelli undertakes his first hostile act."

Efforts to avoid war

Pius XII lobbied world leaders to prevent the outbreak of World War II. With Poland overrun, but France and the Low Countries yet to be attacked, Pius continued to hope for a negotiated peace to prevent the spread of the conflict. The similarly minded US President Franklin D. Roosevelt began to re-establish American diplomatic relations with the Vatican after a seventy-year hiatus and dispatched Myron C. Taylor as his personal representative. American correspondence spoke of "parallel endeavours for peace and the alleviation of suffering". Despite the early collapse of peace hopes, the Taylor mission continued at the Vatican.

Reaction to the racial laws
In 1939, the newly elected Pope Pius XII appointed several prominent Jewish scholars to posts at the Vatican after they had been dismissed from Italian universities under Fascist leader Benito Mussolini's racial laws. Pius later engineered an agreement – formally approved on 23 June 1939 – with Brazilian President Getúlio Vargas to issue 3,000 visas to "non-Aryan Catholics".

However, over the next eighteen months, Brazil's Conselho de Imigração e Colonização (CIC) continued to tighten the restrictions on visa issuance – including requiring a baptismal certificate dated before 1933, a substantial monetary transfer to the Banco do Brasil, and approval by the Brazilian Propaganda Office in Berlin – culminating in the cancellation of the program fourteen months later, after fewer than 1,000 visas had been issued, amid suspicions of "improper conduct" (i.e. continuing to practice Judaism) among those who had received visas.

Encyclical letter Summi Pontificatus

Summi Pontificatus was the first encyclical of Pope Pius XII published on 20 October 1939.  The encyclical is subtitled "On the Unity of Human Society". During the drafting of the letter, the Second World War commenced with the Nazi/Soviet invasion of Catholic Poland. Couched in diplomatic language, Pius endorses Catholic resistance, and states disapproval of the war, racism, the Nazi/Soviet invasion of Poland and the persecutions of the Church. Following themes addressed in Non abbiamo bisogno (1931), Mit brennender Sorge (1937) and Divini redemptoris (1937), Pius wrote of a need to bring back to the Church those who were following "a false standard ... misled by error, passion, temptation and prejudice, [who] have strayed away from faith in the true God". He wrote of "Christians unfortunately more in name than in fact" showing "cowardice" in the face of persecution by these creeds, and endorsed resistance:

Pius wrote of a time requiring "charity" for victims who had a "right" to compassion.

John Cornwell notes the "powerful words" on the theme of the "unity of the human race" and the use of a quotation from Saint Paul that in Christ there is "neither Greek nor Jew, circumcision nor uncircumcision". Frank Coppa wrote "It is true that Pius XII's first encyclical of 20 October 1939 rejected the claims of absolute state authority propounded by the totalitarian powers, but his denunciation was general rather than specific and difficult to decipher."

The Western allies dropped leaflets over Germany containing a translation in German of the Pope's encyclical and broadcast its contents. In Berlin von Bergen declared that the Pope had ceased to be neutral whilst in Italy Mussolini allowed it to be printed. Guenter Lewy notes the Gestapo considered the contents to be sufficiently "innocuous and ambiguous" that they allowed it to be read from the pulpits. He further asserts that the Pope's pronunciations in the encyclical relating to his intention "to give testimony to the truth" without fear of opposition, along with similar sentiments expressed by the German episcopate, "remained an empty formula in the face of the Jewish tragedy". Saul Friedländer also notes that Pius said nothing about the persecution of Jews. Susan Zuccotti opined that Pius failed "dismally" to live up to promises made in the encyclical in the "light of his subsequent silence in the face of appalling horrors". To Zucotti, the letter cannot be depicted as a campaign against anti-Judaism but was still "made a valuable statement". Owen Chadwick notes that Germans, even allowing it to be read from many pulpits, stopped its printing and distribution and the Gestapo ordered inquiries into people who read or tried to distribute it. Chadwick concludes that Summi Pontificatus "in its way it was as strong an attack on Nazi Policies as Mit brennender Sorge of Pius XI".

Ambiguous message on racism

In Summi Pontificatus, Pius XII reiterated Catholic commitment to human brotherhood, in a passage that some commentators have seen as an indirect condemnation of racism and anti-semitism:

Ronald Rychlak wrote that "the equating of Gentiles and Jews would have to be seen as a clear rejection of Hitler's fundamental ideology". Martin Rhonheimer interpreted the text as lacking an "explicit" reference to racism, but containing "implicit" reference to it in the section on "The unity of the human race" which he thinks is possibly an echo of the never-issued encyclical against racism which would have dealt with antisemitism and the "Jewish question", topics not dealt with in Summi Pontificatus. Rhonheimer considered that the encyclical did not condemn the "modern form" of social, political and economic antisemitism which was driven by traditional anti-Judaism and which he saw as shared by Catholics in various degrees. (See also La Civiltà Cattolica and Pope Pius XI's speech to Belgian pilgrims.) Tim Parks has similarly observed that the text does not explicitly address racism, and David Kertzer notes that German newspapers interpreted the encyclical as supporting the German cause.

Invasion of Poland

In Summi Pontificatus, in the aftermath of the invasion of Poland by Nazi Germany and the Soviet Union, Pius XII expressed dismay at the outbreak of war – "the dread tempest of war is already raging despite all Our efforts to avert it" – and declared his sympathy for the Polish people and hope of the resurrection of their nation:

 interprets the encyclical as condemning war but not condemning the invasion.

The Catholic Church in Poland became subject to brutal Nazi repression.

In May 1942, the Pope appointed a German Apostolic Administrator to lands in Nazi-occupied Poland (Wurtheland). According to Phayer (2008), this was seen as implicit recognition of the breakup of Poland and that this, combined with Pius's failure to explicitly censure the invasion, led to a sense of betrayal amongst the Poles.

In December 1942, the Polish President in exile wrote to Pius XII appealing that "the silence must be broken by the Apostolic See".

Hidden encyclical
Walter Bussmann has argued that Pacelli, as Cardinal Secretary of State, dissuaded Pope Pius XI – who was nearing death at the time – from condemning Kristallnacht in November 1938, when he was informed of it by the papal nuncio in Berlin. Likewise a draft, prepared by September 1938, for an encyclical Humani generis unitas ("On the Unity of the Human Race"), was, according to the two publishers of the draft text and other sources, not forwarded to the Vatican by the Jesuit General Wlodimir Ledóchowski. On 28 January 1939, eleven days before the death of Pope Pius XI, a disappointed Gundlach informed the author La Farge: "It cannot continue like this. The text has not been forwarded to the Vatican."

He had talked to the American assistant to Father General, who promised to look into the matter in December 1938, but did not report back. It contained an open and clear condemnation of colonialism, racism and antisemitism. Some historians have argued that Pacelli learned about its existence only after the death of Pius XI and did not promulgate it as Pope. He did however use parts of it in his inaugural encyclical Summi Pontificatus, which he titled "On the Unity of Human Society".

1940–1941

Pius assists German Resistance

The Holocaust was made possible by the German conquest of Europe. Pius XII attempted to stop this conquest. With Poland overrun but France and the Low Countries yet to be attacked, the German Resistance sought the Pope's assistance in preparations for a coup to oust Hitler. Colonel Hans Oster of the Abwehr sent Munich lawyer and devout Catholic Josef Müller on a clandestine trip to Rome to seek papal assistance in the developing plot. Pius, communicating with Britain's Francis d'Arcy Osborne, channelled communications back and forth in secrecy. The Pope warned the Belgian and Dutch Governments that Germany was planning an invasion for 10 May 1940. According to Peter Hebblethwaite, the Germans "regarded the Pope's behaviour as equivalent to espionage". Following the Fall of France, peace overtures continued to emanate from the Vatican, to which Churchill responded resolutely that Germany would first have to free its conquered territories. The negotiations ultimately proved fruitless. Hitler's swift victories over France and the Low Countries deflated the will of the German military to resist Hitler. The Resistance and Pius continued to communicate.

1940 request on behalf of Jews
In 1940 Pius asked members of the clergy, on Vatican letterhead, to do whatever they could on behalf of interned Jews.

1942

1942 Christmas Address to College of Cardinals
In December 1942, in his Christmas discourse to members of the Roman curia, Pius XII remarks on how both the Church and its ministers experience the "sign of contradiction" as they try to defend truth and virtue for the well-being of souls.  The Pope questions whether such efforts of love and sacrifice could nevertheless furnish reasons for lamentation, for pusillanimity, or for the weakening of apostolic courage and zeal.  He responds in the negative:

Historian Guido Knopp describes these comments of Pius as being "incomprehensible" at a time when "Jerusalem was being murdered by the million".

The Netherlands 
On 26 July 1942, Dutch bishops, including Archbishop Johannes de Jong, issued a decree that openly condemned Nazi deportations of Dutch workers and Jews. The Nazi response was the rounding up of over 40,000 Catholics of Jewish descent who were never heard from again. After this event, Sister Pascalina Lehnert said the Pope was convinced that while the Bishop's protest cost forty thousand lives, a protest by him would mean at least two hundred thousand innocent lives that he was not ready to sacrifice. While politicians, generals, and dictators might gamble with the lives of people, a Pope could not. Pius XII often repeated what he told the Italian ambassador to the Vatican in 1940, "We would like to utter words of fire against such actions [German atrocities] and the only thing restraining us from speaking is the fear of making the plight of the victims even worse."<ref>Trevor Fleck.  Never Again: An examination of Catholic–Jewish relations in light of the Holocaust. JUPS Senior Thesis, Georgetown University,  1 April 2006. Accessed 30 November 2012.</ref>

1942 letters
On 18 September 1942, Pius received a letter from Monsignor Montini (future Pope Paul VI), saying, "the massacres of the Jews reach frightening proportions and forms". Later that month, Myron Taylor, U.S. representative to the Vatican, warned Pius that the Vatican's "moral prestige" was being injured by silence on European atrocities. According to Phayer, this warning was echoed simultaneously by representatives from Great Britain, Brazil, Uruguay, Belgium, and Poland.

Taylor passed a US Government memorandum to Pius on 26 September 1942, outlining intelligence received from the Jewish Agency for Palestine which said that Jews from across the Nazi Empire were being systematically "butchered". Taylor asked if the Vatican might have any information which might tend to "confirm the reports", and if so, what the Pope might be able to do to influence public opinion against the "barbarities". Cardinal Maglione handed Harold H. Tittmann, Jr. a response to the letter on 10 October. The note thanked Washington for passing on the intelligence, and confirmed that reports of severe measures against the Jews had reached the Vatican from other sources, though it had not been possible to "verify their accuracy". Nevertheless, "every opportunity is being taken by the Holy See, however, to mitigate the suffering of these unfortunate people".

In December 1942, when Tittmann asked Cardinal Secretary of State Maglione if Pius would issue a proclamation similar to the Allied declaration "German Policy of Extermination of the Jewish Race", Maglione replied that the Vatican was "unable to denounce publicly particular atrocities".

Christmas 1942 message

In his Christmas address of 1942, Pius XII appealed to the world to take a long, hard look at "the ruins of a social order which has given such tragic proof of its ineptitude".

Reinhard Heydrich's Reich Central Security Office analyzed Pius' Christmas message and concluded:

On the contrary, according to Galeazzo Ciano, Mussolini commented on the pope's message with sarcasm: "This is a speech of platitudes which might better be made by the parish priest of Predappio."

1943

Ad maiora mala vitanda
On 30 April 1943, Pius wrote to Bishop Von Preysing of Berlin to say: "We give to the pastors who are working on the local level the duty of determining if and to what degree the danger of reprisals and of various forms of oppression occasioned by episcopal declarations ... ad maiora mala vitanda (to avoid worse) ... seem to advise caution. Here lies one of the reasons, why We impose self-restraint on Ourselves in our speeches; the experience, that we made in 1942 with papal addresses, which We authorized to be forwarded to the Believers, justifies our opinion, as far as We see. ... The Holy See has done whatever was in its power, with charitable, financial and moral assistance. To say nothing of the substantial sums which we spent in American money for the fares of immigrants."

News from Father Scavizzi
In the spring of 1943 Pirro Scavizzi, an Italian priest, told Pius that the murder of the Jews was "now total", even the elderly and infants were being destroyed "without mercy". Pius is reported to have broken down and wept uncontrollably.

Pius said to Father Scavizzi, "I have often considered excommunication, to castigate in the eyes of the entire world the fearful crime of genocide. But after much praying and many tears, I realize that my condemnation would not only fail to help the Jews, it might even worsen their situation ... No doubt a protest would gain me the praise and respect of the civilized world, but it would have submitted the poor Jews to an even worse persecution."

Attempted kidnapping

In 1943, plans were allegedly formulated by Hitler to occupy the Vatican and arrest Pius and the cardinals of the Roman Curia. According to Rev. Peter Gumpel, a historian in charge of Pius' canonization process, the Pope told leading bishops that should he be arrested by Nazi forces, his resignation would take immediate effect and that the Holy See would move to another country, specifically Portugal, where the College of Cardinals would elect a new pope. Some historians argue that the reason Hitler wanted to capture the Pope was because he was concerned Pius would continue speaking against the way the Nazis treated the Jews. However, the plan was never brought to fruition, and was reportedly foiled by Nazi general Karl Wolff. Both British historian Owen Chadwick and Jesuit ADSS editor Robert A. Graham dismissed the existence of a plot as a creation of the Political Warfare Executive. However, subsequent to those accounts, Dan Kurzman in 2007 published a work which he maintains establishes the plot as fact.

German occupation of Rome
According to Joseph Lichten, the Vatican was called upon by the Jewish Community Council in Rome to help fill a Nazi demand of one hundred Troy Pounds (37.3 kilograms) of gold. The Council had been able to muster seventy pounds (26.1 kg.), but unless the entire amount was produced within thirty-six hours had been told three hundred Jews would be imprisoned. The Pope offered an interest-free loan without a time limit, according to Chief Rabbi Zolli of Rome. However, the Roman Jewish community managed to meet the requirement, and delivered the gold to the occupiers on September 28. Despite the payment of the ransom, 1,015 Jews were deported on 16 October 1943 in the Roman razzia, and 839 of them were murdered in concentration and death camps. Many others were also killed on 24 March 1944, at the Fosse Ardeatine.

Nuncio Orsenigo's appeal to Hitler

In November 1943, nuncio Cesare Orsenigo spoke to the leader of the Third Reich on behalf of Pope Pius XII. In his conversation with Hitler, he talked about the status of persecuted peoples in the Third Reich, apparently referring to Jews. This conversation with the Nazi leader led to no success. Over large parts of the conversation Hitler simply ignored Orsenigo; he went to the window and did not listen.

1944–1945

Actions of Angelo Roncalli

Part of the historical debate surrounding Pius XII has concerned the role of nuncio Angelo Roncalli, the future John XXIII, in rescuing Jews during the War. While some historians have argued that Roncalli was acting as a nuncio on behalf of the Pope, others have said that he was acting on his own when he intervened on behalf of Jews, as it would appear by the rather independent position he took during the Jewish orphans controversy. According to Michael Phayer, Roncalli always said that he had been acting on the orders of Pius XII in his actions to rescue Jews.

According to the Raoul Wallenberg Foundation, Roncalli forwarded a request for the Vatican to inquire whether other neutral countries could grant asylum to Jews, to inform the German government that the Palestine Jewish Agency had 5,000 immigration certificates available and to ask Vatican Radio to broadcast that helping Jews was an act of mercy approved by the Church. In 1944, Roncalli used diplomatic couriers, papal representatives and the Sisters of Our Lady of Zion to transport and issue baptismal certificates, immigration certificates and visas – many of them forged – to Hungarian Jews. A dispatch dated Aug. 16, 1944 from Roncalli to the papal nuncio to Hungary illustrates the intensity of "Operation Baptism".

Roman razzia

On 28 October 1943, Ernst von Weizsäcker, the German Ambassador to the Vatican, telegrammed Berlin that "the Pope has not yet let himself be persuaded to make an official condemnation of the deportation of the Roman Jews. ... Since it is currently thought that the Germans will take no further steps against the Jews in Rome, the question of our relations with the Vatican may be considered closed."

After receiving a sentence of death, Adolf Eichmann wrote in his diary an account of the round up of Roman Jews: "At that time, my office received the copy of a letter, that I immediately gave to my direct superiors, sent by the Catholic Church in Rome, in the person of Bishop Hudal, to the commander of the German forces in Rome, General Stahel. The Church was vigorously protesting the arrest of Jews of Italian citizenship, requesting that such actions be interrupted immediately throughout Rome and its surroundings. To the contrary, the Pope would denounce it publicly ... The Curia was especially angry because these incidents were taking place practically under Vatican windows. But, precisely at that time, without paying any attention to the Church's position, the Italian Fascist Government passed a law ordering the deportation of all Italian Jews to concentration camps. ... The objections given and the excessive delay in the steps necessary to complete the implementation of the operation resulted in a great part of Italian Jews being able to hide and escape capture."

Historian Susan Zuccotti, author of Under His Very Windows: The Vatican and the Holocaust in Italy, wrote "If the Pope remained silent, however, he allowed nuns, monks, priests, and prelates in his diocese, including several at the Vicaraite, to involve themselves in Jewish rescue. Many Church institutions, including Vatican properties sheltered Jews along with other types of fugitives for long periods." James Kurth in his essay The Defamation of Pope Pius XII, writes that she [Susan Zuccotti] "is intent on arguing that Pius XII even allowed the deportation of the Jews of Rome from 'under his very windows'. To do so, she has to be silent about the much greater number of Roman Jews that the Church, with the approval of the Pope, hid within a wide network of monasteries, convents, schools, and hospitals, 'under the very windows' of the Gestapo and the collaborating Fascist police." Kurth concludes his article "It is a demonstration of the depravity and hypocrisy of these liberals and radicals that they seek to achieve the silence and passivity of the Pope and the Church during this current and ongoing holocaust [abortion], by falsely accusing them of committing the crimes of silence and passivity during the Holocaust of sixty years ago."

In August 2006, extracts from the 60-year-old diary of a nun of the Convent of Santi Quattro Coronati were published in the Italian press, stating that Pope Pius XII ordered Rome's convents and monasteries to hide Jews during the Second World War.

Conversions of Jews to Catholicism
The conversion of Jews to Catholicism during the Holocaust is one of the most controversial aspects of the record of Pope Pius XII during that period. According to Roth and Ritner, "this is a key point because, in debates about Pius XII, his defenders regularly point to denunciations of racism and defense of Jewish converts as evidence of opposition to antisemitism of all sorts". The Holocaust is one of the most acute examples of the "recurrent and acutely painful issue in the Catholic-Jewish dialogue", namely "Christian efforts to convert Jews".

Meeting with Churchill

In August 1944, following the Liberation of Rome Pius met British Prime Minister Winston Churchill, who was visiting the city. At their meeting, the Pope acknowledged the justice of punishing war criminals, but expressed a hope that the people of Italy would not be punished, but, with the war continuing, he hoped that they would be made "full allies".

Holocaust by country

Austria
In 1941, Cardinal Theodor Innitzer of Vienna informed Pius of Jewish deportations in Vienna.

Croatia

Archbishop Stepinac called a synod of Croatian bishops in November 1941. The synod appealed to Croatian leader Ante Pavelić to treat Jews "as humanely as possible, considering that there were German troops in the country". The Vatican replied with praise to Marcone with praise for what the synod had done for "citizens of Jewish origin", although Israeli historian Menachem Shelah demonstrates that the synod concerned itself only with converted Jews. Pius XII personally praised the synod for "courage and decisiveness".

France
Later in 1941, when asked by French Marshal Philippe Pétain if the Vatican objected to anti-Jewish laws, Pius responded that the Church condemned antisemitism, but would not comment on specific rules. Similarly, when Philippe Pétain's regime adopted the "Jewish statutes", the Vichy ambassador to the Vatican, Léon Bérard (a French politician), was told that the legislation did not conflict with Catholic teachings. Valerio Valeri, the nuncio to France was "embarrassed" when he learned of this publicly from Pétain and personally checked the information with Cardinal Secretary of State Maglione who confirmed the Vatican's position.

Yet in June 1942 Pius personally protested against the mass deportations of Jews from France, ordering the papal nuncio to protest to Marshal Pétain against "the inhuman arrests and deportations of Jews". In October 1941 Harold Tittman, a U.S. delegate to the Vatican, asked the pope to condemn the atrocities against Jews; Pius replied that the Vatican wished to remain "neutral", reiterating the neutrality policy which Pius invoked as early as September 1940.

Hungary
Before the Holocaust began, an International Eucharistic Conference took place in Budapest in Hungary during 1938. Cardinal Pacelli addressed the congress and described the Jews as people "whose lips curse [Christ] and whose hearts reject him even today". Michael Phayer asserts that the timing of the statement, during a period when Hungary was in the process of formulating new antisemitic laws, ran counter to Pope Pius XI's September statement urging Catholics to honour their spiritual father Abraham.

In March 1944, through the papal nuncio in Budapest, Angelo Rotta, the pope urged the Hungarian government to moderate its treatment of the Jews. The pope also ordered Rotta and other papal legates to hide and shelter Jews. These protests, along with others from the King of Sweden, the International Red Cross, the United States, and Britain led to the cessation of deportations on 8 July 1944. Also in 1944, Pius appealed to 13 Latin American governments to accept "emergency passports", although it also took the intervention of the U.S. State Department for those countries to honor the documents.

Lithuania
Cardinal Secretary of State Luigi Maglione received a request from Chief Rabbi of Palestine Yitzhak HaLevi Herzog in the Spring of 1939 to intercede on behalf of Lithuanian Jews about to be deported to Germany. Pius called Ribbentrop on 11 March, repeatedly protesting against the treatment of Jews. In his 1940 encyclical Summi Pontificatus, Pius rejected antisemitism, stating that in the Catholic Church there is "neither Gentile nor Jew, circumcision nor uncircumcision". In 1940 Pius asked members of the clergy, on Vatican letterhead, to do whatever they could on behalf of interned Jews.

The Netherlands
After Germany invaded the Low Countries during 1940, Pius XII sent expressions of sympathy to the Queen of the Netherlands, the King of Belgium, and the Grand Duchess of Luxembourg. When Mussolini learned of the warnings and the telegrams of sympathy, he took them as a personal affront and had his ambassador to the Vatican file an official protest, charging that Pius XII had taken sides against Italy's ally Germany. Mussolini's foreign minister claimed that Pius XII was "ready to let himself be deported to a concentration camp, rather than do anything against his conscience".

When Dutch bishops protested against the wartime deportation of Jews in 1942, the Nazis responded with harsher measures rounding up 92 converts including Edith Stein who were then deported and murdered. "The brutality of the retaliation made an enormous impression on Pius XII."

Slovakia
In September 1941 Pius objected to a Slovakian Jewish Code, which, unlike the earlier Vichy codes, prohibited intermarriage between Jews and non-Jews.

In 1942, the Slovakian charge d'affaires told Pius that Slovakian Jews were being sent to concentration camps. On 11 March 1942, several days before the first transport was due to leave, the chargé d'affaires in Bratislava reported to the Vatican: "I have been assured that this atrocious plan is the handwork of ... Prime Minister (Tuka), who confirmed the plan ... he dared to tell me – he who makes such a show of his Catholicism – that he saw nothing inhuman or un-Christian in it ... the deportation of 80,000 persons to Poland, is equivalent to condemning a great number of them to certain death."  The Vatican protested to the Slovak government that it "deplore[s] these ... measures which gravely hurt the natural human rights of persons, merely because of their race".

On 7 April 1943, Monsignor Domenico Tardini, one of Pius's closest advisors, told Pius that it would be politically advantageous after the war to take steps to help Slovakian Jews.

Alleged silence
Historian Susan Zuccotti argued that "Pius XII, the head of the Roman Catholic Church during the Second World War, did not speak out publicly against the destruction of the Jews. This fact is rarely contested, nor can it be. Evidence of a public protest, if it existed, would be easy to produce. It does not exist." Ecclesiastical historian William Doino (author of The Pius War: Responses to the Critics of Pius XII) contests Zuccotti's assertion, and has said that Pius XII was "emphatically not 'silent', and did in fact condemn the Nazis' horrific crimes–through Vatican Radio, his first encyclical, Summi Pontificatus, his major addresses (especially his Christmas allocutions), and the L’Osservatore Romano" and he "intervened, time and time again, for persecuted Jews, particularly during the German occupation of Rome, and was cited and hailed by the Catholic rescuers themselves as their leader and director". Indeed, Pius XII said in the Christmas address that mankind owed a vow "to the hundreds of thousands of persons who, without any fault on their part, sometimes only because of their nationality or race, have been consigned to death or slow extermination."

In A History of Christianity, Michael Burleigh writes:

According to Giovanni Maria Vian of the Vatican Jesuit journal La Civiltà Cattolica the roots of Pius's alleged "silence", what he terms "a black legend", begins in early 1939 with the complaint of the French Catholic intellectual Emmanuel Mounier who questioned the failure of the Pope to censure the Italian aggression of Italy towards Albania and wrote off "the scandal of this silence". He further notes that in 1951 another French Catholic intellectual, François Mauriac, wrote in the introduction to a book by "the Jew Poliakov" that "we never had the comfort of hearing the successor of Galilee, Simon Peter, [i.e Pius XII] use clear and precise words, rather than diplomatic allusions, to condemn the countless crucifixions of the 'brothers of the Lord' [i.e. Jewish people]".

The British representative to the Vatican wrote the following in 1942: "A policy of silence in regard to such offences against the conscience of the world must necessarily involve a renunciation of moral leadership and a consequent atrophy of the influence of the Vatican". Pius himself noted on 3 August 1946 "We condemned on various occasions in the past the persecution that a fanatical anti-Semitism inflicted on the Hebrew people." Garry Wills comments that "this is a deliberate falsehood. He never publicly mentioned the Holocaust." Michael Phayer notes that with the exception of the "very guarded terms" used in the 1942 Christmas message, Pope Pius did not speak out publicly about the Holocaust. Paul Johnson wrote "The Pope gave no guidance. Pius XII advised all Catholic everywhere to fight with valour and charity" and "What made Pius keep silent, apart from natural timidity and fear for the safety of the Vatican itself, was undoubtedly his belief that a total breach between Rome and Hitler would lead to a separatist German Catholic Church."

Ronald Rychlak notes that Pius was recorded as saying "No doubt a protest would have gained me praise and respect of the civilized world, but it would have submitted the poor Jew to an even worse fate." Guenter Lewy notes that some writers have suggested that a public protest by the Pope would only have made things worse for the Jews but comments "Since the condition of the Jews could hardly have become worse, and might have changed for the better, as a result of a papal denunciation, one could ask why the Church did not risk the well being and safety of the Catholics and of the Vatican." Michael Phayer notes Pius XII making similar excuses in 1940 but comments that "This justification cannot be taken seriously." It is worth pointing out though, that while European Jews were being exterminated, the Nazis never systematically killed Mischlinge, or people of partial Jewish descent. Frank Coppa wrote: "During World War II as well, Papa Pacelli's diplomatic focus often restricted his moral mission, refusing to openly condemn Nazism's evil actions including its genocide when it appeared it might triumph, but denouncing it as satanic when it was defeated."

Martin Rhonheimer comments "Well-intentioned Catholic apologists continue to produce reports of Church condemnations of Nazism and racism. But these do not really answer the Church's critics. The real problem is not the Church's relationship to National Socialism and racism, but the Church's relationship to the Jews. Here we need what the Church today urges: a 'purification of memory and conscience.' The Catholic Church's undeniable hostility to National Socialism and racism cannot be used to justify its silence about the persecution of the Jews. It is one thing to explain this silence historically and make it understandable. It is quite another to use such explanations for apologetic purposes."

Cardinal Tisserant, a senior member of the Roman Curia wrote to Cardinal Suhard, the Archbishop of Paris, as Nazi forces were overrunning France in June 1940. Tisserant expressed his concern at the racism of the Nazis, the systematic destruction of their victims and the moral reserve of Pope Pius XII: "I'm afraid that history may be obliged in time to come to blame the Holy See for a policy accommodated to its own advantage and little more. And that is extremely sad – above all when one has lived under Pius XI."

President Franklin D. Roosevelt sent Myron C. Taylor as his special representative to the Vatican in September 1941. His assistant, Harold Tittman, repeatedly pointed out to Pius the dangers to his moral leadership by his failure to speak out against the violations of the natural law carried out by the Nazis.  Pius XII responded that he could not name the Nazis without at the same time mentioning the Bolsheviks.

Pius XII also never publicly condemned the Nazi massacre of 1.8–1.9 million mainly Catholic Polish gentiles (including 2,935 members of the Catholic Clergy), nor did he ever publicly condemn the Soviet Union for the deaths of over 100,000 mainly Catholic Polish gentile citizens including an untold number of clergy.

In an interview Father Peter Gumpel stated that Robert Kempner's (former U.S. Nuremberg war crimes prosecutor) foreword to Jeno Levai's 1968 book "Hungarian Jewry and the Papacy" asserts that Pope Pius did indeed complain through diplomatic channels about the situation of Hungarian Jews but that any public protestation would have been of no use.

Praise from Jewish leaders

Post-war praise by Jewish leaders

Pinchas Lapide, a Jewish theologian and Israeli diplomat to Milan in the 1960s, wrote in Three Popes and the Jews that Catholics were "instrumental in saving at least 700,000 but probably as many as 860,000 Jews from certain death at Nazi hands". Some historians have questioned this oft-cited number, which Lapide reached by "deducting all reasonable claims of rescue" by non-Catholics from the number of Jews he claims succeeded in escaping to the free world from Nazi-controlled areas during the Holocaust.

According to Rabbi David Dalin, in the aftermath of the war, some of the Jewish leaders who hailed Pius XII a righteous gentile for his work in saving thousands of Jews included the scientist Albert Einstein, the Israeli Prime Ministers Golda Meir and Moshe Sharett, and the Chief Rabbi Yitzhak HaLevi Herzog.

The Chief Rabbi of Rome, Israel Zolli, took refuge in the Vatican following the Nazi occupation of Rome in 1943. Upon the arrival of the Allied Forces in Rome, on June 4, 1944, Israel Zolli resumed the post of Grand Rabbi and in the following July he celebrated a solemn ceremony in the Synagogue, which was broadcast by radio, to publicly express the gratitude of the Jewish community to Pius XII, for the help given to them during the Nazi persecution. Furthermore, on 25 July 1944 he went to the Vatican for an audience to officially thank the pope for what he, personally or through Catholics, had done in favor of the Jews, hosting them or hiding them in convents and monasteries, to save them from the racist hatred of the SS. Nazis; thus decreasing the already immense number of victims. After the war he converted to Catholicism and took the name "Eugenio" in honour of Pope Pius XII.

On 21 September 1945, the general secretary of the World Jewish Council, Dr. Leon Kubowitzky, presented an amount of money to the pope, "in recognition of the work of the Holy See in rescuing Jews from Fascist and Nazi persecutions". After the war, in the autumn of 1945, Harry Greenstein from Baltimore, a close friend of Chief Rabbi Herzog of Jerusalem, told Pius how grateful Jews were for all he had done for them. The pope replied, "My only regret is not to have been able to save a greater number of Jews."

Catholic scholar Kevin Madigan interprets such praise from prominent Jewish leaders, including Golda Meir, as less than sincere; an attempt to secure Vatican recognition of the State of Israel.

Historiography

Early accounts
Early literature on the war time leadership of Pius XII was positive, including Halecki and Murray's Pius XII: Eugenio Pacelli, Pope of Peace (1954) and Nazareno Padellaro's Portrait of Pius XII (first published in Italian in 1949). Later, more critical accounts were written.

Pius XII died in October 1958. In 1959 the German bishops issued a series of statements regarding the Holocaust which acknowledged German guilt, in particular that of Catholics and their bishops. Michael Phayer considered it no accident that they waited until Pius's death before speaking out and that all those who had not kept silent were post-war appointees. During Adolf Eichmann's much publicized trial in 1960 a question arose relating to the Vatican's knowledge of the Holocaust and if Pope Pius's refusal to speak out was based on fears on what would happen to German Catholics. This sparked public debate in Germany on the relationship of the Church to the Holocaust and Michael Phayer identifies this as when Pius's XII high repute began to wane.

E. W. Bockenforde's article published in the Catholic periodical "Hochland" in 1961 resulted in vehement attacks by many Catholics. In 1962 the historian Friedrich Heer commented that "In 1945 the situation was so critical that only a gigantic attempt at concealment was ... able to save and restore the face of official Christianity in Germany ... I have to confess that all Catholics, from the highest to the lowest – priest, chaplains, laymen (anti-Semitic to this day) – are co-responsible for the mass murder of the Jews."

In 1960 Guenter Lewy began work on his book "The Catholic Church and Nazi Germany", combing the records of the German diocesan, State and party archives, and finally publishing the work in 1964. Though recognising that the Church is hierarchical, it is not immune to the influence of its branches and therefore he does not focus purely on the role of Pius XII. Lewy wrote "It is symptomatic of the boldness with which some Catholic writers after 1945 have falsified important documents from the Nazi period."

In 1963, Rolf Hochhuth staged his play The Representative (or The Deputy) which depicted Pius as an antisemite and indifferent to the Holocaust. The depiction was called "unhistorical" and lacking "credible substantiation" by the Encyclopedia Britannica. John Cornwell, himself a critic of Pius, described the play as "historical fiction based on scant documentation" and "is so wide of the mark as to be ludicrous".

Saul Friedländer, whose parents were murdered in Auschwitz, published his book Pius XII and the Third Reich amidst the controversy around The Deputy, in 1964. It relied heavily on primary sources and concentrated on diplomatic correspondence between the Holy See and Germany. Friedländer hoped that the Vatican would open up its own archives and in 1964 Pope Paul VI commissioned a group of Jesuit scholars to edit and publish the Vatican's records. These were published in eleven volumes between 1965 and 1981.

Carlo Falconi published in 1965 "The Silence of the Pope" and followed this with "The Popes of the Twentieth Century" in 1967 in which he criticised Pius XII for "failing to speak out"; "he also was guilty of inadmissible silence about the millions of civilian victims of Nazism – Jews, Poles, Serbs, Russians, gypsies, and others". Falconi was the first to research and publicise the atrocities committed by Croatian Ustashe against Jews and Serbs. Joseph Bottum considers these early attacks, by Lewy, Friedländer, and Falconi, as "more serious and scholarly" and "by today's standards, quite moderate and thoughtful".

The Deputy

In 1963, Rolf Hochhuth's controversial drama Der Stellvertreter. Ein christliches Trauerspiel (The Deputy, a Christian tragedy, released in English in 1964) portrayed Pope Pius XII as a hypocrite who remained silent about the Holocaust. Books such as Dr. Joseph Lichten's A Question of Judgment (1963), written in response to The Deputy, defended Pius XII's actions during the war. Lichten labelled any criticism of the pope's actions during World War II as "a stupefying paradox" and said, "no one who reads the record of Pius XII's actions on behalf of Jews can subscribe to Hochhuth's accusation". Critical scholarly works like Guenter Lewy's The Catholic Church and Nazi Germany (1964) also followed the publication of The Deputy. Lewy's conclusion was that "the Pope and his advisers—influenced by the long tradition of moderate anti-Semitism so widely accepted in Vatican circles—did not view the plight of the Jews with a real sense of urgency and moral outrage. For this assertion no documentation is possible, but it is a conclusion difficult to avoid." Carlo Falconi (1967) described Hochhuth's depiction as crude and inaccurate, but he does not accept the explanations put forward by apologists of Pius regarding his alleged silence. In particular he rejects the defence of not making things worse by public denunciation since no fate could have been worse than what the Jews were undergoing and that on the one occasion when bishops did speak out against the euthanasia of disabled people the Nazis backed down. He also rejected the defence that the Pope did not know of what was happening since in his opinion this is directly contradicted by instances in which Pius did make diplomatic interventions. In 2002 the play was adapted into the film Amen.An article on Jesuit Vatican journal La Civiltà Cattolica in March 2009 indicated that the accusations that Hochhuth's play made widely known originated not among Jews but in the Communist bloc. It was Moscow Radio, on 2 June 1945, that first direct against Pius XII the accusation of refusing to speak out against the exterminations in Nazi concentration camps. It was also the first to call him "Hitler's Pope". The same journal during the pontificate of Pius was still accusing the Jews of being "Christ killers" and of indulging in ritual murder as late as 1942.

Defector and former Securitate General Ion Mihai Pacepa has stated that the play of Hochhuth and numerous publications attacking Pius XII as allegedly having been a Nazi sympathizer were fabrications from the KGB and Eastern bloc Marxist secret services leading a campaign to discredit the moral authority of the Church and Christianity in the West. Pacepa also claims that he was involved in contacting East bloc agents close to the Vatican in order to fabricate the story to be used for the attack against the wartime pope.

Paul VI's defense of Pius
During his 1964 visit to Jordan and Israel, Paul VI passionately spoke out in defense of Pius during his farewell to the Israeli authorities. He said that all know what he accomplished in defense and for the rescue of all those who faced difficulties, with no distinction whatsoever. He added that nothing is more unjust than this outrage against such a venerable figure.

 Recent literature 

 Hitler's Pope and The Myth of Hitler's Pope 

In recent decades, the legacy of Pius XII in relation to the Holocaust has been the subject of critical and supportive literature. Authors such as John Cornwell, Garry Wills, Michael Phayer, James Carroll, Susan Zuccotti and Daniel Goldhagen have written critical assessments, while Jewish historians such as Richard Breitman, David Dalin, Martin Gilbert, Pinchas Lapide, Jeno Levai and Michael Tagliacozzo, as well as non-Jewish scholars such as Pierre Blet, Antonio Gaspari, Robert Graham, Peter Gumpel, Margherita Marchione, Michael O'Carroll, Piertro Palazzini, Kenneth Whitehead, Ralph McInerny, Michael Feldkamp, M. L. T. Brown and Andrea Tornielli have written extensively on the work he did to aid the Jews during the war.

In 1999, John Cornwell's controversial Hitler's Pope was highly critical of Pius, arguing that he had not "done enough", or "spoken out enough" against the Holocaust. Cornwell argued that Pius's entire career as the nuncio to Germany, cardinal secretary of state, and pope was characterized by a desire to increase and centralize the power of the Papacy, and that he subordinated opposition to the Nazis to that goal. He further argued that Pius was antisemitic and that this stance prevented him from caring about the European Jews. (Cornwell's views have developed (as noted below), now stating he is unable to judge the Pope's motivation). In the assessment of the Encyclopedia Britannica, Cornwell's depiction of the Pope as antisemitic, lacked "credible substantiation". Kenneth L. Woodward stated in his review in Newsweek that "errors of fact and ignorance of context appear on almost every page".

Cornwell's work was the first to have access to testimonies from Pius's beatification process as well as to many documents from Pacelli's nunciature which had just been opened under the seventy-five year rule by the Vatican State Secretary archives. Cornwell's work was highly controversial. Much praise of Cornwell centered around his disputed claim that he was a practising Catholic who had attempted to absolve Pius with his work.

Susan Zuccotti's Under His Very Windows: The Vatican and the Holocaust in Italy (2000) and Michael Phayer's The Catholic Church and the Holocaust, 1930–1965 (2000) provided further critical, though more scholarly analysis of Pius' legacy.

In 2005, Jesuit historian Vincent Lapomarda wrote:

A number of scholars have replied with favourable accounts of the Pius XII, including Margherita Marchione's Yours Is a Precious Witness: Memoirs of Jews and Catholics in Wartime Italy (1997), Pope Pius XII: Architect for Peace (2000) and Consensus and Controversy: Defending Pope Pius XII (2002); Pierre Blet's Pius XII and the Second World War, According to the Archives of the Vatican (1999); and Ronald J. Rychlak's Hitler, the War and the Pope (2000). Ecclesiastical historian William Doino, author of The Pius War: Responses to the Critics of Pius XII, concluded that Pius was "emphatically not silent".

In specific riposte to Cornwell's moniker, American rabbi and historian, David Dalin, published The Myth of Hitler's Pope: How Pope Pius XII Rescued Jews from the Nazis in 2005 and reaffirmed previous accounts of Pius having been a saviour of thousands of Europe's Jews. In a review of the book, the eminent Holocaust historian and Churchill biographer, Sir Martin Gilbert, wrote that Dalin's work was "an essential contribution to our understanding of the reality of Pope Pius XII's support for Jews at their time of greatest danger. Hopefully, his account will replace the divisively harmful version of papal neglect, and even collaboration, that has held the field for far too long."

Five years after the publication of Hitler's Pope, Cornwell stated: "I would now argue, in the light of the debates and evidence following Hitler's Pope, that Pius XII had so little scope of action that it is impossible to judge the motives for his silence during the war, while Rome was under the heel of Mussolini and later occupied by Germany." In 2009 Cornwell wrote of the "fellow travellers" i.e. those priests in Nazi Germany who accepted the benefits that came with the Reichskonkordat but who failed to condemn the Nazi regime at the same time. He cites Cardinal Pacelli (the future Pope Pius XII) as being an example of a "fellow traveller" who was willing to accept the generosity of Hitler in the educational sphere (more schools, teachers and pupil places), so long as the Church withdrew from the social and political sphere, at the same time as Jews were being dismissed from universities and Jewish pupil places were being reduced. For this he considers Pacelli as effectively being in collusion with the Nazi cause, if not by intent. He further argues that Monsignor Kass, who was involved in negotiations for the Reichskonkordat, and at that time the head of the Roman Catholic Centre Party, persuaded his party members, with the acquiescence of Pacelli, in the summer of 1933 to enable Hitler to acquire dictatorial powers. He argues that the Catholic Centre Party vote was decisive in the adoption of dictatorial powers by Hitler and that the party's subsequent dissolution was at Pacelli's prompting.

 Controversy – "The Pius Wars" 
There have been many books published on the subject of Pius XII and the holocaust, often coupled with heated debate, such that it has been described as the "Pius Wars".

Michael Burleigh comments that "Making use of the Holocaust as the biggest moral club to use against the Church, simply because one does not like its policies on abortion, contraception, homosexual priests or the Middle East, is as obscene as any attempt to exploit the deaths of six million European Jews for political purposes."

A spokesperson for the nineteen Catholic scholars who wrote a letter to Pope Benedict XVI in 2010 asking that the process of sainthood for Pius XII be slowed down, and which asserted that "Pope Pius XII did not issue a clearly worded statement, unconditionally condemning the wholesale slaughter and murder of European Jews", affirmed that "We're all practicing Catholics. We're faithful to the Holy Father."

Joseph Bottum notes Philip Jenkins opinion that criticisms are not really about Pius XII: "Philip Jenkins understands it as not particular to Pius XII at all, but merely a convenient trope by which American commentators express what he calls an entirely new form of anti-Catholicism. Others see it in a continuum of more old-fashioned American distaste for the Whore of Babylon that dwells in Rome, spinning Jesuitical plots."

Daniel Goldhagen describes defenders of the Church using Pius XII as a lightning rod to divert peoples attention away from the broader issues, focusing attention on favorable points and concealing others. He further argues that those who use a person's identity as a Jew, Catholic or German as a tool to further their cause betray a great deal about themselves as such tactics are often used to stifle sober debate by switching attention away from the truth as exemplified by the charge of "anti-Catholicism" by apologists.  Daniel Goldhagen notes Father Peter Gumpel's comments that describes opponents of Pius XII as the "Jewish faction" which has something against Catholics.

Garry Wills acknowledges that Pius's response to the Holocaust may have been founded on a sincere, if mistaken, belief that he was doing the correct thing. However, he deprecates arguments "defending Pius with false readings of history" and for "distortions by which the Vatican tries to deny its own sorry story with regard to the Jews. Pius's denial of his own silence, perpetrated by those who must make false claims in order to defend the words of a saint, would make him the source of a new round of deceit structured into past dishonesties."

International Catholic-Jewish Historical Commission

In 1999, in an attempt to address some of this controversy, the International Catholic-Jewish Historical Commission (Historical Commission), a group of three Catholic and three Jewish scholars was appointed, respectively, by the Holy See's Commission for Religious Relations with the Jews (Holy See's Commission) and the International Jewish Committee for Interreligious Consultations (IJCIC), to whom a preliminary report was issued in October 2000.

The Commission did not discover any documents, but had the agreed-upon task to review the existing Vatican volumes, that make up the Actes et Documents du Saint Siege (ADSS) The Commission was internally divided over the question of access to additional documents from the Holy See, access to the news media by individual commission members, and, questions to be raised in the preliminary report. It was agreed to include all 47 individual questions by the six members, and use them as Preliminary Report. In addition to the 47 questions, the commission issued no findings of its own. It stated that it was not their task to sit in judgement of the Pope and his advisers but to contribute to a more nuanced understanding of the papacy during the Holocaust.

The 47 questions by the six scholars were grouped into three parts: 

The disagreement between members over additional documents locked up under the Holy See's 70 year rule resulted in a discontinuation of the Commission in 2001 on friendly terms.  Unsatisfied with the findings, Dr. Michael Marrus, one of the three Jewish members of the Commission, said the commission "ran up against a brick wall. ... It would have been really helpful to have had support from the Holy See on this issue."

Yad Vashem controversy
An inscription at Yad Vashem states that Pius XII's record during the Holocaust was controversial, and that he negotiated a concordat with the Nazis, maintained Vatican neutrality during the war and, formerly stated that he took no initiatives to save Jews.

In 1985, Pietro Palazzini was honored by the museum, where he protested the repeated criticisms against Pius, on whose instructions Palazzini declared to have acted. Palazzini, a theological advisor to the Pontiff,  had taught and written about the moral theology of Pope Pius XII.

David G. Dalin argues in The Myth of Hitler's Pope that Yad Vashem should honor Pope Pius XII as a "Righteous Gentile", and documents that Pius was praised by all the leading Jews of his day for his role in saving more Jews than Oskar Schindler.

David Rosen has taken exception to the caption, stating when Pius died both Moshe Sharett and Golda Meir sent telegrams stating that when darkness reigned over Europe, he was one of the few who raised his voice in protest. "What Yad Vashem says is not necessarily wrong," conceded Rosen, "but it doesn't give us all the information." Rabbi Rosen later quoted historian Martin Gilbert, who says that Pius saved thousands of Jews.

In light of recent developments and research, on 1 July 2012, Yad Vashem changed the inscription to note a "considerable number of secret rescue activities" by the Church. Whereas the old text claimed the Pope "did not intervene" in the deportation of Jews from Rome, the new inscription says that he "did not publicly protest".  The display also added text from Pius' Christmas 1942 radio speech in which he speaks of "hundreds of thousands of persons who, without any fault on their part", were killed, but it also points out that he did not specifically name the Jews. The new wording also removed the former claim that Concordat was signed "even at the price of recognizing the Nazi regime".  Yad Vashem indicated that the new inscription is due to "research that has been done in the recent years and presents a more complex picture than previously presented", including in part the opening of the Pope's archives.

We Remember: A Reflection on the Shoah
In 2000, Pope John Paul II, on behalf of all people, apologized to Jews by inserting a prayer at the Western Wall that read "We're deeply saddened by the behavior of those in the course of history who have caused the children of God to suffer, and asking your forgiveness, we wish to commit ourselves to genuine brotherhood with the people of the Covenant."

This papal apology, one of many issued by Pope John Paul II for past human and Church failings throughout history, was especially significant because John Paul II emphasized Church guilt for, and the Second Vatican Council's condemnation of, antisemitism. The papal letter We Remember: A Reflection on the Shoah urged Catholics to repent "of past errors and infidelities" and "renew the awareness of the Hebrew roots of their faith".

Developments since 2008
A special conference of scholars on Pius XII on the 50th anniversary of his death was held in Rome on 15–17 September 2008, by Pave the Way Foundation. Pope Benedict XVI held a reception for the conference participants on 19 September 2008 where he praised Pius XII as a pope who made every effort to save Jews during the war. A second conference was held on 6–8 November 2008 by the Pontifical Academy for Life.

On 9 October 2008, the 50th anniversary of Pius XII's death, Benedict XVI celebrated pontifical mass in his memory. Shortly prior to, and after the mass, dialectics continued between some Jewish religious leaders and the Vatican as Rabbi Shear Yeshuv Cohen of Haifa addressed the Synod of Bishops and expressed his disappointment towards Pius XII's "silence" during the war.

The CRIF, an organization which represent Jews in France, has opposed the beatification of Pius XII.

In a self-penned article in the New York Daily News, Gary Krupp of the Pave the Way Foundation described how he and fellow researchers had discovered many documents detailing little-known activities of Pacelli from early in his career and later as Pius in which he gave assistance to Jews and wrote that "it's time for our 'historians' to correct this academic negligence and honestly research the open archives". He also wrote "We must acknowledge what Pius actually did rather than criticize him for what he should have done. Pope Pius should be commended for his courageous actions that saved more Jewish lives than all the world's leaders combined."

The methodology of Pave the Way Foundation relating to the historical record of Pope Pius XII has been subject to harsh criticism from many scholars and long-established Jewish organizations. Professor Dwork, Rose Professor of Holocaust History and Director of the Strassler Center for Holocaust and Genocide Studies at Clark University, said Krupp's research was "amateurish, worse than amateurish — risible" and that "He may be well-meaning, but his lack of experience in international affairs and historical research makes Mr. Krupp highly vulnerable to being manipulated by factions inside the Vatican."

In February 2010 nineteen Catholic scholars of theology and history asked Pope Benedict XVI to slow the process of the sainthood cause of Pope Pius XII. The scholars said existing research "leads us to the view that Pope Pius XII did not issue a clearly worded statement, unconditionally condemning the wholesale slaughter and murder of European Jews" and "At the same time, some evidence also compels us to see that Pius XII's diplomatic background encouraged him as head of a neutral state, the Vatican, to assist Jews by means that were not made public during the war. It is essential that further research be conducted to resolve both these questions"; furthermore, "Mistrust and apprehension still exist", as "For many Jews and Catholics, Pius XII takes on a role much larger than his historical papacy. In essence, Pius XII has become a symbol of centuries-old Christian anti-Judaism and anti-Semitism."

On 1 July 2012, Yad Vashem changed the inscription regarding Pius to soften its criticism and admit rescue efforts by the Vatican. Yad Vashem indicated that the new inscription is due to "research that has been done in the recent years and presents a more complex picture than previously presented".

See also
Catholic resistance to Nazi Germany
Nazi persecution of the Catholic Church
Pontifical Commission for Religious Relations with the Jews
Pope Pius XII and the raid on the Roman ghetto
Relations between Catholicism and Judaism
Rescue of Jews by Catholics during the Holocaust
Pope Pius XII and Judaism
Pope Pius XII and the Roman razzia
Catholic Church and Nazi Germany
Pius Wars

 Notes 

 References 

Bibliography

 
 
 
 
 
 
 
 
 
 
 
 
 
 
 
 
 
 
 
 
 
 
 
 
  Also see Amazon Online Reader
 
 
 
 
 

Further reading

 
 Coppa, Frank J. "Pope Pius XII: From the Diplomacy of Impartiality to the Silence of the Holocaust." Journal of Church and State'' 55.2 (2013): 286-306 online.

 
 
 
 
 
 
 
 
 
  Also see Amazon Online Reader

External links
Group Gives New Proof of Pius XII's Help for Jews.
Hitler's Pope A Judgment Historically Unsustainable by Tarcisio Bertone
Understanding the Vatican During the Nazi Period by Michael Marrus

 
Catholicism and Judaism
Pope Pius XII